Roy Ottoway Wilkins (August 30, 1901 – September 8, 1981) was a prominent activist in the Civil Rights Movement in the United States from the 1930s to the 1970s. Wilkins' most notable role was his leadership of the National Association for the Advancement of Colored People (NAACP), in which he held the title of Executive Secretary from 1955 to 1963 and Executive Director from 1964 to 1977. Wilkins was a central figure in many notable marches of the civil rights movement. He made valuable contributions in the world of African-American literature, and his voice was used to further the efforts in the fight for equality. Wilkins' pursuit of social justice also touched the lives of veterans and active service members, through his awards and recognition of exemplary military personnel.

Early life
Wilkins was born in St. Louis, Missouri, on August 30, 1901. His father was not present for his birth, having fled the town in fear of being lynched after he refused demands to step away and yield the sidewalk to a white man. When he was four years old, his mother died from tuberculosis, and Wilkins and his siblings were then raised by an aunt and uncle in the Rondo Neighborhood of St. Paul, Minnesota, where they attended local schools. His nephew was Roger Wilkins. Wilkins graduated from the University of Minnesota with a degree in sociology in 1923.

In 1929, he married social worker Aminda "Minnie" Badeau; the couple had no children of their own, but they raised the two children of Hazel Wilkins-Colton, a writer from Philadelphia, Pennsylvania.

Early career 

While attending college, Wilkins worked as a journalist at The Minnesota Daily and became editor of The Appeal, an African-American newspaper. After he graduated he became the editor of The Call in 1923.

His confrontation of the Jim Crow Laws led to his activist work, and in 1931 he moved to New York City as assistant NAACP secretary under Walter Francis White. When W. E. B. Du Bois left the organization in 1934, Wilkins replaced him as editor of The Crisis, the official magazine of the NAACP. From 1949 to 1950, Wilkins chaired the National Emergency Civil Rights Mobilization, which comprised more than 100 local and national groups.

He served as an adviser to the War Department during World War II.

In 1950, Wilkins—along with A. Philip Randolph, founder of the Brotherhood of Sleeping Car Porters, and Arnold Aronson, a leader of the National Jewish Community Relations Advisory Council—founded the Leadership Conference on Civil Rights (LCCR). LCCR has become the premier civil rights coalition, and has coordinated the national legislative campaign on behalf of every major civil rights law since 1957.

NAACP leadership 

In 1955, Wilkins was chosen to be the executive secretary of the NAACP and in 1964, he became its executive director. He had developed an excellent reputation as a spokesperson for the Civil Rights Movement. One of his first actions was to provide support to civil rights activists in Mississippi who were being subjected to a "credit squeeze" by members of the White Citizens Councils.

Wilkins backed a proposal suggested by Dr. T. R. M. Howard of Mound Bayou, Mississippi, who headed the Regional Council of Negro Leadership, a leading civil rights organization in the state. Under the plan, black businesses and voluntary associations shifted their accounts to the black-owned Tri-State Bank of Memphis, Tennessee. By the end of 1955, about $300,000 had been deposited in Tri-State for that purpose. The money enabled Tri-State to extend loans to credit-worthy blacks who were denied loans by white banks. Wilkins participated in the March on Washington (August 1963), which he had helped organize. The march was dedicated to the idea of protesting through acts of nonviolence in which Wilkins was a firm believer. Wilkins also participated in the Selma to Montgomery marches (1965) and the March Against Fear (1966).

He believed in achieving reform by legislative means, testified before many Congressional hearings, and conferred with Presidents Kennedy, Johnson, Nixon, Ford, and Carter. Those achievements gained Wilkins attention from government officials and other established politicians, earning him respect as well as the nickname, "Mr. Civil Rights". Wilkins strongly opposed militancy in the movement for civil rights as represented by the "black power" movement because of his support for nonviolence. He was a strong critic of racism in any form regardless of its creed, color, or political motivation, and he also declared that violence and racial separation of blacks and whites were not the answer. As late as 1962, Wilkins criticized the direct action methods of the Freedom Riders, but changed his stance after the Birmingham campaign, and was arrested for leading a picketing protest in 1963.

On issues of segregation, as well, he was a proponent of systematic integration instead of radical desegregation. In a 1964 interview with Robert Penn Warren for the book Who Speaks for the Negro?, Wilkins declared,

However, his moderate views increasingly brought him into conflict with younger, more militant black activists who saw him as an "Uncle Tom."

Wilkins was also a member of Omega Psi Phi, a fraternity with a civil rights focus and one of the intercollegiate Greek-letter fraternities established for African Americans.

In 1964, he was awarded the Spingarn Medal by the NAACP.

During his tenure, the NAACP played a pivotal role in leading the nation into the Civil Rights Movement and spearheaded the efforts that led to significant civil rights victories, including Brown v. Board of Education, the Civil Rights Act of 1964, and the Voting Rights Act of 1965.

In 1968, Wilkins also served as chair of the U.S. delegation to the International Conference on Human Rights. After turning 70 in 1971, he faced increased calls to step down as NAACP chief. In 1976, he fell into a dispute with undisclosed board members at the NAACP national convention in Memphis, Tennessee. Although he had intended to retire that year, he decided to postpone it until 1977 because he thought that the pension plan offered to him by the NAACP was inadequate. Board member Emmitt Douglas of Louisiana demanded that Wilkins disclose the offenders and not impugn the board as a whole. Wilkins merely said that the offenders had "vilified" his reputation and questioned his health and integrity.

In 1977, at the age of 76, Wilkins finally retired from the NAACP and was succeeded by Benjamin Hooks. Wilkins was honored with the title Director Emeritus of the NAACP in the same year. He died on September 8, 1981, in New York City, from heart problems related to a pacemaker implanted on him in 1979 because of his irregular heartbeat. In 1982, his autobiography, Standing Fast: The Autobiography of Roy Wilkins, was published posthumously.

Views 
Wilkins was a staunch liberal and proponent of American values during the Cold War. He denounced suspected and actual communists within the Civil Rights Movement. He had been criticized by some on the left of the movement, such as Daisy Bates, Paul Robeson, W. E. B. Du Bois, Robert F. Williams, and Fred Shuttlesworth, for his cautious approach, suspicion of grassroots organizations, and conciliatory attitude towards white anticommunism.

In 1951, J. Edgar Hoover and the US State Department, in collusion with the NAACP and Wilkins, who was then the editor of The Crisis, the official magazine of the NAACP, arranged for a ghost-written leaflet to be printed and distributed in Africa. The purpose of the leaflet was to spread negative press and views about the black political radical and entertainer Paul Robeson throughout Africa. Roger P. Ross, a State Department public affairs officer working in Africa, issued three pages of detailed guidelines including the following instructions:

United States Information and Educational Exchange (USIE) in the Gold Coast, and I suspect everywhere else in Africa, badly needs a through-going, sympathetic and regretful but straight talking treatment of the whole Robeson episode... there's no way the Communists score on us more easily and more effectively out here, than on the US. Negro problem in general, and on the Robeson case in particular. And, answering the latter, we go a long way toward answering the former.American Consul, Accra. 179. January 9, 1951, USIE: Request for Special Story on Paul Robeson declassified October 19, 1979.

The finished article published by the NAACP was called Paul Robeson: Lost Shepherd, and penned under the false name of "Robert Alan," who the NAACP claimed was a "well known New York journalist." Another article by Roy Wilkins, "Stalin's Greatest Defeat," denounced Robeson and the Communist Party USA in terms consistent with the FBI's information.

At the time of Robeson's widely misquoted declaration at the Paris Peace Conference that blacks would not support the United States in a war against the Soviet Union because of the continued lynchings and their legal second-class citizen status after World War II, Wilkins stated that regardless of the number of lynchings that then occurred or would occur, black Americans would always serve in the armed forces.

Wilkins also threatened to cancel a charter of an NAACP youth group in 1952 if it did not cancel its planned Robeson concert.

Support for military
During the presidencies of Kennedy and Johnson, the Civil Rights Movement was in its peak. International affairs were somewhat overlooked by numerous members of the NAACP and other civil rights groups in order to focus on domestic issues in the United States. However, Wilkins stayed true to his liberal values and carried them to the White House during his time with the NAACP. Wilkins's friendship and constant correspondence with Johnson gave him an even-larger platform to speak out on war efforts and policies affecting civil rights.

His views towards the participation of black military members in the US military was a point of contention between him and other prominent civil rights leaders. While most civil rights groups and activists stayed quiet or spoke out against the Vietnam War, Wilkins focused on what African-Americans could gain out of serving in the military. An article posted in the Western Journal of Black Studies suggests that black troops were fighting for equality both in the United States as well as overseas. Wilkins emphasized the financial benefits of serving in the military along with the importance of African-American citizens participating in the first integrated American army.

Wilkins's efforts to further equality in the realm of international affairs were publicly recognized in 1969, when he was awarded the Presidential Medal of Freedom by Lyndon Johnson.

Death and legacy
Wilkins died on September 8, 1981, eight days after his 80th birthday in New York City, U.S. During his later life Wilkins was frequently referred to as the "Senior Statesman" of the Civil Rights Movement.

In 1982, his autobiography Standing Fast: The Autobiography of Roy Wilkins was published posthumously.

The Roy Wilkins Renown Service Award was established in 1980 to recognize members of the Armed Forces who embodied the spirit of equality and human rights. The St. Paul Auditorium was renamed for Wilkins in 1985. The Roy Wilkins Center for Human Relations and Social Justice was established at the University of Minnesota's Hubert H. Humphrey School of Public Affairs in 1992. Roy Wilkins Park in St. Albans, Queens, New York was named after him as a unique public and cultural touchstone for all of New York City.

Gil Scott-Heron mentioned Wilkins in his spoken word song "The Revolution Will Not Be Televised" with this lyric: "There will be no slow motion or still life of Roy Wilkins strolling through Watts in a red, black and green liberation jumpsuit that he has been saving for just the proper occasion." Amiri Baraka stated, in his "Civil Rights Poem", that "if i ever see roywilkins [sic.] on the sidewalks imonna [sic.] stick half my sandal up his ass". In 2001, the U.S. Postal Service issued a 34 cent stamp honoring Wilkins. In 2002, Molefi Kete Asante listed Roy Wilkins on his list of the 100 Greatest African Americans.

He is played by Joe Morton in the 2016 television drama All the Way. Chris Rock is set to portray him in the 2023 Netflix film Rustin.

See also 
 Civil rights movement (1896–1954)
 Leadership Conference on Civil Rights
 List of civil rights leaders
 Roger Wilkins, nephew of Roy, also a prominent civil rights activist
 Roy Wilkins Auditorium, an arena in Saint Paul, Minnesota
 Timeline of the civil rights movement
 Thurgood Marshall, Wilkins' colleague at the NAACP and U.S. Supreme Court Justice
 March on Washington for Jobs and Freedom

References

Sources 
 Yvonne Ryan, Roy Wilkins: The Quiet Revolutionary and the NAACP. Lexington, KY: University Press of Kentucky, 2014.
 Arvarh E. Strickland, "Roy Wilkins," American National Biography Online, February. 2000.

External links 

 Roy Wilkins in MNopedia, the Minnesota Encyclopedia 
 The Roy Wilkins Memorial in St. Paul, Minnesota: a virtual tour.
 The Leadership Conference on Civil Rights
 Oral History Interview with Roy Wilkins, from the Lyndon Baines Johnson Library
 
 Roy Wilkins's FBI files hosted at the Internet Archive
 

1901 births
1981 deaths
African-American activists
20th-century American writers
African-American journalists
American magazine editors
Congressional Gold Medal recipients
NAACP activists
People from Saint Paul, Minnesota
People from St. Louis
Presidential Medal of Freedom recipients
Spingarn Medal winners
University of Minnesota College of Liberal Arts alumni